John Rice Divers (24 November 1931 – 9 November 2005) was a Scottish footballer.

Divers was born in Glasgow and began his career with junior side Ashfield, before transferring to Clyde. He stayed there for 3 years, and he won the 1955 Scottish Cup. He later played for Exeter City and East Stirlingshire.

References

External links 

1931 births
2005 deaths
Scottish footballers
Association football wingers
Ashfield F.C. players
Clyde F.C. players
Exeter City F.C. players
East Stirlingshire F.C. players
Scottish Football League players
English Football League players
Footballers from Glasgow
Scottish Junior Football Association players
Scotland junior international footballers